The Women's 50 Freestyle swimming event at the 25th SEA Games was held on December 14, 2009.

The Games Record at the start of the event was: 26.13 by Singapore's Joscelin Yeo at the 2005 Games (December 3).

Results

Final

Preliminary heats

References

Swimming at the 2009 Southeast Asian Games
2009 in women's swimming